The Swiftsure-class ships of the line were a class of two 74-gun third rates, designed for the Royal Navy by Sir John Henslow.

Ships

Builder: Adams, Bucklers Hard
Ordered: 1800
Launched: 23 July 1804
Fate: Sold, 1845

Builder: Adams, Bucklers Hard
Ordered: 21 December 1803
Launched: 20 October 1808
Fate: Sold, 1862

References

Lavery, Brian (2003) The Ship of the Line - Volume 1: The development of the battlefleet 1650-1850. Conway Maritime Press. .

 
Ship of the line classes